Loveridge's limbless skink (Melanoseps loveridgei) is an extant species of skink, a lizard in the family Scincidae. The species is found in  Tanzania and Zambia.

Etymology
The specific name, loveridgei, is in honor of British herpetologist Arthur Loveridge.

References

Melanoseps
Reptiles described in 1982
Taxa named by Édouard-Raoul Brygoo